Spinipogon virginanus is a species of moth of the family Tortricidae. It is found on the British Virgin Islands.

The wingspan is about 9 mm. The ground colour of the forewings is whitish cream, with weak yellowish suffusions and brownish dots and strigulae (fine streaks). The markings are yellowish brown, but browner at the costa and mixed with brownish grey at the dorsum. The hindwings are pale brownish grey, but darker on the periphery.

Etymology
The species name refers to the Virgin Islands, where the type locality is located.

References

Moths described in 2007
Cochylini